Bereket is a village in the District of Çine, Aydın Province, Turkey. As of 2010, it had a population of 374 people.

References

Villages in Çine District